The Phoenix Mercury are an American professional basketball team based in Phoenix, Arizona, playing in the Western Conference in the Women's National Basketball Association (WNBA). The team was founded before the league's inaugural 1997 season began; it is one of the eight original franchises. The team is owned by Mat Ishbia, who also owns the NBA team Phoenix Suns.

The Mercury have qualified for the WNBA Playoffs in fifteen of its twenty-four years in Phoenix. The franchise has been home to players such as former UConn Diana Taurasi, Rutgers grad Cappie Pondexter, former Temple power forward Candice Dupree, former Baylor center Brittney Griner, and Australian guard Penny Taylor. In 1998, 2007, 2009, 2014, and 2021 the Mercury went to the WNBA Finals; they lost to Houston in 1998, but won the title in 2007, 2009, and 2014 over Detroit, Indiana, and Chicago respectively.

Franchise history

Mercury heating up (1997–1998)
With a cast that included hall-of-famer Nancy Lieberman, and possible future hall-of-famers Michele Timms of Australia, and Jennifer Gillom,  hyper-active star Bridget Pettis, and outspoken coach Cheryl Miller, the Mercury quickly established itself as a major franchise. In the very first WNBA season, the Mercury posted a 16–12 record and reached the first WNBA playoffs. The Mercury lost to the New York Liberty, though, in those playoffs.

In 1998, the Mercury again qualified for the playoffs, posting a 19–11 record. The Mercury defeated the Cleveland Rockers to reach the WNBA Finals for the first time. In a hard-fought series, the Mercury fell 2 games to 1 to the defending champion Houston Comets.

Mercury in retrograde (1999–2003)
In 1999, the Mercury missed the playoffs, posting a 15–17 record. In 2000, the Mercury finished 20–12, but got swept by the Los Angeles Sparks. The team descended into turmoil after the season, as coach Miller left and the original core group of players broke up, via retirement or trades, and the team stopped being a playoff contender.

From 2001 to 2004, the Mercury were at the bottom of the WNBA. Fielding miserable teams, the Mercury were never competitive. The Mercury went through coach after coach, and nothing worked. During the lean years, the franchise remained in the news as forward Lisa Harrison would become a sex symbol. Playboy Magazine offered her money to pose in their magazine. She would decline the offer.

Diana Taurasi joins the WNBA (2004–2005)
After a horrible 2003 season, in which the Mercury posted an 8–26 record, the Mercury won the #1 overall choice in the 2004 WNBA Draft, and select coveted former UConn star Diana Taurasi. Taurasi went on to win the WNBA Rookie of the Year Award in the 2004 season, as the Mercury posted a better 17–17 record. The Mercury posted a 16–18 record in 2005, missing the playoffs again.

Bringing back "Paul Ball" (2006–2007)
Former NBA coach Paul Westhead became the Mercury's head coach prior to the 2006 season and brought his up-tempo style to Phoenix.  Westhead was the first WNBA coach to have won a previous NBA championship (1980 LA Lakers). The Mercury also drafted Cappie Pondexter with the #2 overall selection in the 2006 WNBA Draft. The addition provided Taurasi with a solid #2 player.  Westhead's run and gun offense quickly became The Mercury's trademark and the franchise would soon set new league records for points scored.

The 2006 season was a positive one for the Mercury, as they posted a winning record for the first time since 2000, at 18–16. The Mercury competed for the playoffs all year, but fell just short of a postseason berth.

As the 2007 season came, the Mercury were poised and hungry for a deep playoff run. The Mercury would run away with the Western Conference, posting their best record in franchise history at 23–11, as well as clinching the #1 seed. The Mercury set a record by averaging 89.0 points in a season during 2007. In their first playoffs since 2000, the Mercury made quick work of the Seattle Storm in the first round, blowing them out in two games (Game 1: 101–84, Game 2: 95–89). In the Western Finals, the Mercury swept the San Antonio Silver Stars in a closer series (Game 1: 102–100, Game 2: 98–92), advancing to the WNBA Finals for the first time in nine years. In the Finals, the Mercury faced the defending 2006 champions Detroit Shock. The two teams split the first two games in Detroit. Coming back home, the Mercury suffered a letdown in game 3, losing 88–83. Down 2–1, the Mercury had to win game 4 or lose. Game 4 came down to the final seconds, but the Mercury edged out the Shock 77–76, with Cappie Pondexter scoring 26 points, and forced a Game 5 in Detroit. In Game 5, Phoenix won by a score of 108–92. Penny Taylor scored a game high 30 points in Game 5, and went 18-for-18 from the line. The Mercury won the series and their first championship with a 108–92 Game 5 victory, becoming the first WNBA team to win a championship on the road. Cappie Pondexter was named the WNBA Finals MVP, and averaged 22.0 points and 5.6 assists in the series. On November 7, 2007, The Mercury announced the hiring of Corey Gaines as head coach to replace the departing Paul Westhead.

Mercury fall, Mercury rise (2008–2011)
In 2008, the Mercury started slowly and never really found a groove, finishing the season with a disappointing record of 16–18, well out of the playoff picture in a tough Western Conference.  The Mercury became the first team in WNBA history with the dubious honor of failing to qualify for the playoffs after winning the WNBA Finals the year before.

However, a year later, the Mercury were back to what they were two years before. The Mercury clinched the top spot in the playoffs along with the number one seed in the Western Conference. The Mercury defeated the 2008 conference champion San Antonio Silver Stars in the first round, winning the very exciting series 2–1 after losing the first game on the road. The Mercury then defeated the Los Angeles Sparks in the conference finals, winning 2–1 in a series that ended Lisa Leslie's career. The Mercury then went on to beat the Indiana Fever 3–2 in the best of 5 series to capture the second title in their franchise history. Diana Taurasi captured the WNBA Finals MVP Award. All-star guard Cappie Pondexter was traded to the New York Liberty amid some controversy in the offseason; All-Star Candice Dupree joined the duo of Taurasi and Penny Taylor as the Mercury looked to repeat in 2010.

It was not easy, however, as the Mercury faced a few bad losing streaks throughout the 2010 season. The team managed to finish 15–19, good for second place in the Western Conference. Phoenix swept San Antonio in the first round of the Playoffs, but lost to the eventual champion Seattle Storm in the conference finals.

After a hectic offseason for Diana Taurasi, most of the Mercury team was rested and ready to play. The team started the 2011 season with a surprising 0–3 record, but flew back into playoff contention, entering the All-Star break with a 10–5 record. Ultimately, they recovered to gain the third seed in the 2011 WNBA Playoffs, and upset the Seattle Storm in the opening round, closing an 18-point deficit to win on Seattle's home floor, allowing the Mercury to reach its third straight conference finals. Unfortunately, for the team, they came up short against the top-seeded Minnesota Lynx, losing in two games.

Brittney Griner arrives, and history is made (2013–present)

Coming off the 2012 WNBA season in which the Phoenix Mercury franchise finished with the second worst record in the WNBA, a 7–27 mark, Phoenix received the 2013 WNBA draft lottery and secured the top overall pick. Once the 2013 WNBA Draft arrived in April 2013, the Mercury used the top overall pick on two time Women's College Basketball Wooden award winner Brittney Griner. However, the Mercury lost to the Lynx in the Conference round of the playoffs.
The following season the Mercury under the guidance of new coach Sandy Brondello went on to set an all time WNBA record for wins in a season, with 29, and breezed through the 2014 playoffs to claim their 3rd WNBA Championship.

On February 3, 2015, Diana Taurasi announced that she would sit out the 2015 WNBA season at the request of her Russian Premier League team, UMMC Ekaterinburg.  The team offered Taurasi to pay her more than her WNBA salary to skip the 2015 WNBA season.  For the 2014 WNBA season, Taurasi made just under the league maximum of $107,000. But she makes 15 times that - approximately $1.5 million - playing overseas.

In 2016, the WNBA switched to a playoff format involving single elimination games in the first two rounds.  The eighth-seeded Mercury upset the Indiana Fever in the First Round and New York Liberty in the Second Round to reach the Semifinals.  However, they lost the Semifinals to the Minnesota Lynx.

In 2017, the Mercury once again sailed through the first two rounds of the playoffs, winning their games against the Seattle Storm and Connecticut Sun.  Again, they lost in the Semifinals, this time to the Los Angeles Sparks.

2018 saw the Mercury win both single-elimination playoff games for the third year in a row with victories against the Dallas Wings and Connecticut Sun, giving Diana Taurasi a 13–0 record in winner-take-all elimination games in her career.  In the semifinals, the Mercury came up short against the Seattle Storm in the decisive fifth game, giving Taurasi her first ever loss in a winner-take-all elimination game.

Uniform sponsor
In June 2009 the Mercury and WNBA announced a sponsorship agreement with identity theft protection service LifeLock to place that company's logo on their jerseys through the 2013 season, making the Mercury among the first non-soccer franchises in the major leagues of North America to place a company logo on their uniforms. For the 2014 season and going forward, the Mercury will wear jerseys sponsored by Casino Arizona and Talking Stick Resort.

Season-by-season records

Players

Current roster

Former players

DeWanna Bonner (2009–2019), now an member of the Connecticut Sun
Kara Braxton (2010–2011)
Monique Currie (2015)
Anna DeForge (2003–2005)
Candice Dupree (2010–2016)
Tonya Edwards (2000-2001)
Jennifer Gillom (1997–2002)
Michelle Griffiths (1998–2000)
Isabelle Harrison (2016), now a member of the Dallas Wings
Lisa Harrison (1999–2005)
Tamicha Jackson (2003; 2006)
Temeka Johnson (2009–2011)
Nancy Lieberman (1997)
Kelly Mazzante (2007–2009)
Kelly Miller (2006–2008)
Leilani Mitchell (2015, 2017–2019), now a member of the Washington Mystics
Bridget Pettis (1997–2001)
Erin Phillips (2014)
Plenette Pierson (2003–2005), now an assistant coach of the Minnesota Lynx
Cappie Pondexter (2006–2009)
Brandy Reed (1998; 2000–2002)
Danielle Robinson (2017), now a member of the Indiana Fever
Tangela Smith (2007–2010)
Belinda Snell (2005–2007)
Maria Stepanova (1998–2001, 2005)
Penny Taylor (2004–2007; 2009–2011; 2013–2014; 2016)
Michelle Timms (1997–2001)
Kamila Vodičková (2005–2006)
Adrian Williams-Strong (2000–2004)
Le'coe Willingham (2009), now an assistant coach of the Dallas Wings

Retired numbers

Hall of Famers
(from Women's Basketball Hall of Fame)
Ann Meyers-Drysdale, enshrined 1999
Jennifer Gillom, enshrined 2009
Nancy Lieberman, enshrined 1996
Cheryl Miller, enshrined 1995
Linda Sharp, enshrined 2001
Michele Timms, enshrined 2008
Penny Taylor, enshrined 2022

FIBA Hall of Famers

Coaches and staff

Owners
Jerry Colangelo, owner of the Phoenix Suns (1997–2003)
Robert Sarver, owner of the Phoenix Suns (2004–present)

Head coaches

General managers
Cheryl Miller (1997–2000)
Seth Sulka (2001–2006)
Ann Meyers-Drysdale (2007–2011)
Corey Gaines (2012–2013)
Amber Cox (2013)
Jim Pitman (2013–present)

Assistant coaches

Steve Smith (1997)
Kathy Anderson (1998)
Carrie Graf (1998–1999, 2001, 2003)
Howie Landa (1999)
Tom Lewis (2000)
Linda Sharp (2000–2002)
Vonn Read (2000)
Eric Cooper (2001–2002)
Gary Kloppenburg (2003)
Brian Agler (2004)
Lisa Harrison (2004)
Cedric Ceballos (2004)
Michele Timms (2005)
Bridget Pettis (2006–2011)
Corey Gaines (2006–2007)
Earl Cureton (2012–2013)
Tom Hovasse (2012–2013)
Anthony Boone (2013)
Julie Hairgrove (2005–2021)
Todd Troxel (2014–2018)
Penny Taylor (2019)
Chasity Melvin (2020–2021)
Nikki Blue (2022–Present)
Cinnamon Lister (2022–Present)
Crystal Robinson (2022–Present)

Statistics

|-
| 1997
| J. Gillom (15.7)
| T. Foster (6.1)
| M. Timms (5.1)
| 69.2 vs 65.2
| 32.9 vs 33.0
| .373 vs .413
|-
| 1998
| J. Gillom (20.8)
| J. Gillom (7.3)
| M. Timms (5.3)
| 73.9 vs 67.5
| 31.4 vs 31.4
| .424 vs .434
|-
| 1999
| J. Gillom (15.2)
| M. Askamp (7.2)
| M. Timms (5.0)
| 68.0 vs 68.2
| 31.3 vs 31.6
| .399 vs .415
|-

|-
| 2000
| B. Reed (19.0)
| B. Reed (5.8)
| M. Cleary (3.2)
| 70.1 vs 65.7
| 27.9 vs 30.3
| .446 vs .423
|-
| 2001
| J. Gillom (12.3)
| M. Stepanova (6.3)
| K. Veal (4.3)
| 64.5 vs 67.8
| 29.4 vs 32.2
| .405 vs .415
|-
| 2002
| J. Gillom (15.3)
| A. Williams (6.9)
| G. Grubin (3.3)
| 65.3 vs 71.6
| 28.7 vs 31.3
| .420 vs .455
|-
| 2003
| A. DeForge (11.9)
| A. Williams (7.4)
| T. Jackson (4.3)
| 61.7 vs 66.8
| 29.4 vs 32.8
| .382 vs .447
|-
| 2004
| D. Taurasi (17.0)
| P. Taylor (4.8)
| D. Taurasi (3.9)
| 67.6 vs 65.7
| 26.9 vs 30.0
| .430 vs .425
|-
| 2005
| D. Taurasi (16.0)
| K. Vodichkova (7.0)
| D. Taurasi (4.5)
| 69.4 vs 69.2
| 31.2 vs 30.1
| .414 vs .429
|-
| 2006
| D. Taurasi (25.3)
| K. Vodichkova (6.7)
| D. Taurasi (4.1)
| 87.1 vs 84.7
| 33.7 vs 37.7
| .443 vs .433
|-
| 2007
| D. Taurasi (19.2)
| T. Smith (6.5)
| K. Miller (4.6)
| 89.0 vs 85.4
| 33.9 vs 40.9
| .439 vs .405
|-
| 2008
| D. Taurasi (24.1)
| T. Smith (7.0)
| K. Miller (4.0)
| 88.5 vs 88.5
| 36.1 vs 38.2
| .430 vs .421
|-
| 2009
| D. Taurasi (20.4)
| D. Bonner (5.8)
| C. Pondexter (5.0)
| 92.8 vs 89.1
| 35.0 vs 37.8
| .460 vs .424
|-

|-
| 2010
| D. Taurasi (22.6)
| C. Dupree (7.6)
| P. Taylor (5.0)
| 93.9 vs 93.8
| 35.7 vs 37.6
| .473 vs .455
|-
| 2011
| D. Taurasi (21.6)
| C. Dupree (8.2)
| P. Taylor (4.7)
| 89.0 vs 86.0
| 35.1 vs 34.2
| .461 vs .440
|-
| 2012
| D. Bonner (20.6)
| K. Thomas (8.0)
| S. Prahalis (4.5)
| 74.5 vs 86.7
| 37.4 vs 36.1
| .384 vs .437
|-
| 2013
| D. Taurasi (20.3)
| C. Dupree (6.4)
| D. Taurasi (6.2)
| 79.7 vs 80.3
| 35.1 vs 34.2
| .453 vs .411
|-
| 2014
| D. Taurasi (16.2)
| B. Griner (8.0)
| D. Taurasi (5.6)
| 83.5 vs 74.1
| 33.7 vs 34.5
| .484 vs .409
|-
| 2015
| D. Bonner (15.8)
| B. Griner (8.1)
| D. Bonner (3.3)
| 75.1 vs 72.3
| 33.4 vs 35.0
| .437 vs .396
|-
| 2016
| D. Taurasi (17.8)
| B. Griner (6.5)
| D. Taurasi (3.9)
| 84.6 vs 83.3
| 32.4 vs 34.4
| .453 vs .440
|-
| 2017
| B. Griner (21.9)
| B. Griner (7.6)
| L. Mitchell (3.6)
| 81.9 vs 81.9
| 32.1 vs 34.6
| .440 vs .438
|-
| 2018
| D. Taurasi (20.7)
| B. Griner (7.7)
| D. Taurasi (5.3)
| 85.8 vs 83.2
| 32.6 vs 34.4
| .457 vs .431
|-
| 2019
| B. Griner (20.7)
| D. Bonner (7.6)
| D. Taurasi (5.3)
| 76.5 vs 77.6
| 32.5 vs 37.2
| .424 vs .422
|-

|-
| 2020
| D. Taurasi (18.7)
| B. Turner (9.0)
| B. Hartley & D. Taurasi (4.5)
| 86.1 vs 84.1
| 34.0 vs 36.0
| .450 vs .425
|-
| 2021
| B. Griner (20.5)
| B. Griner (9.5)
| S. Diggins-Smith (5.3)
| 82.1 vs 79.5
| 36.2 vs 34.9
| .450 vs .417
|-
| 2022
| S. Diggins-Smith (19.7)
| B. Turner (6.8)
| S. Diggins-Smith (5.5)
| 81.1 vs 84.1
| 31.2 vs 37.2
| .429 vs .441

Media coverage
Currently, some Mercury games are broadcast on Bally Sports Arizona. The broadcaster for the Mercury games is Kevin Ray.

All games (excluding blackout games, which are available on ESPN3.com) are broadcast to the WNBA LiveAccess game feeds on the league website. Furthermore, some Mercury games are broadcast nationally on ESPN, ESPN2, CBS, CBS Sports Network and ABC. The WNBA has reached an eight-year agreement with ESPN, which will pay right fees to the Mercury, as well as other teams in the league.

All-time notes

Regular season attendance
A sellout for a basketball game at Talking Stick Resort Arena is 18,422 (capacity from 1997 to 2002 was 19,023).

Draft picks
1997 Elite: Bridget Pettis (7), Nancy Lieberman-Cline (15)
1997: Toni Foster (8), Tia Jackson (9), Umeki Webb (24), Monique Ambers (25)
1998: Maria Stepanova (8), Andrea Kuklova (18), Brandy Reed (28), Karen Wilkins (38)
1999: Edna Campbell (10), Clarissa Davis-Wrightsil (22), Lisa Harrison (34), Amanda Wilson (46)
2000: Adrian Williams (21), Tauja Catchings (37), Shantia Owens (53)
2001: Kristen Veal (13), Ilona Korstine (29), Tere Williams (45), Carolyn Moos (53), Megan Franza (61)
2002: Tootie Shaw (25), Kayte Christensen (40), Amba Kongolo (56)
2003 Miami/Portland Dispersal Draft: Tamicha Jackson (4)
2003: Plenette Pierson (4), Petra Ujhelyi (16), Telisha Quarles (31), Marion Jones (33)
2004 Cleveland Dispersal Draft: Penny Taylor (1)
2004: Diana Taurasi (1), Chandi Jones (8), Ashley Robinson (14), Maria Villarroel (27)
2005: Sandora Irvin (3), Angelina Williams (18), Jamie Carey (31)
2006: Cappie Pondexter (2), Liz Shimek (18), Mistie Williams (21), Crystal Smith (32)
2007 Charlotte Dispersal Draft: selection waived
2007: Lindsey Harding (1), Tyresa Smith (18), Leah Rush (28), Chrissy Givens (31), Emily Westerbeg (37)
2008: LaToya Pringle (13), Leilani Mitchell (25), Merscilla Packer (41)
2009 Houston Dispersal Draft: Sequoia Holmes (5)
2009: DeWanna Bonner (5), Sha Brooks (31), Jessica Adair (34)
2010 Sacramento Dispersal Draft: selection waived
2010: Tyra Grant (24), Nyeshia Stevenson (36)
2011: Brittany Spears (19), Tahnee Robinson (31)
2012: Samantha Prahalis (6), C'eria Ricketts (24), Christine Flores (30), Amanda Johnson (33)
2013: Brittney Griner (1), Nikki Greene (26)
2014: Tiffany Bias (17), Maggie Lucas (21), Stephanie Talbot (33)
2015: Isabelle Harrison (12), Alex Harden (18), Žofia Hruščáková (24), Promise Amukamara (36)
2016: Courtney Williams (8), Jullian Alleyne (20), Nirra Fields (32)
2017: Alexis Prince  (29)
2018: Marie Gülich (12), Tyler Scaife (20), Raisa Musina (21), Imani Wright (26)
2019: Alanna Smith (8), Sophie Cunningham (13), Arica Carter (32)
2020: Jocelyn Willoughby (10), Te'a Cooper (18), Stella Johnson (29)
2021: Ciera Johnson (32)
2022: Maya Dodson (26), Macee Williams (32)

Trades
July 31, 1997: The Mercury acquired Mikiko Hagiwara from the Sacramento Monarchs in exchange for future considerations.
July 6, 1998: The Mercury traded Pauline Jordan to the Sacramento Monarchs in exchange for Tiffani Johnson.
October 27, 1999: The Mercury traded Marlies Askamp, Angela Aycock and Kristi Harrower to the Minnesota Lynx in exchange for Adia Barnes, Tonya Edwards and Trisha Fallon.
February 18, 2000: The Mercury acquired Brandy Reed from the Minnesota Lynx in exchange for the fifth pick in the 2000 Draft.
April 25, 2000: The Mercury traded Shantia Owens to the Miami Sol in exchange for a fourth-round pick in the 2001 Draft.
May 27, 2001: The Mercury acquired Jaynetta Saunders from the Cleveland Rockers in exchange for a second-round pick in the 2002 Draft.
June 22, 2001: The Mercury traded Tonya Edwards to the Charlotte Sting in exchange for a second-round pick in the 2002 Draft.
March 4, 2002: The Mercury traded the eighth pick in the 2002 Draft to the Cleveland Rockers in exchange for Pollyana Johns-Kimborough.
March 4, 2002: The Mercury traded the 15th pick in the 2002 Draft to the Miami Sol in exchange for Tracy Reid and the 13th pick in the 2002 Draft.
March 4, 2002: The Mercury traded Bridget Pettis and the 13th pick in the 2002 Draft to the Indiana Fever in exchange for Gordana Grubin.
May 3, 2002: The Mercury traded a fourth-round pick in the 2003 Draft to the Detroit Shock in exchange for Claudia das Neves.
May 5, 2002: The Mercury traded Claudia das Neves to the Miami Sol in exchange for a third-round pick in the 2003 Draft.
April 28, 2003: The Mercury traded Petra Ujhelyi and Telisha Quarles to the Detroit Shock in exchange for Edwina Brown and Lenae Williams.
July 31, 2003: The Mercury traded Stacey Thomas to the Detroit Shock in exchange for Tamara Moore.
June 29, 2005: The Mercury traded Plenette Pierson to the Detroit Shock in exchange for Andrea Stinson and a second-round pick in the 2006 Draft.
February 21, 2007: The Mercury traded Sandora Irvin to the San Antonio Silver Stars in exchange for a second-round pick in the 2008 Draft.
April 2, 2007: The Mercury traded a second-round pick in the 2008 Draft to the New York Liberty in exchange for Kelly Schumacher.
April 4, 2007: The Mercury traded Lindsey Harding to the Minnesota Lynx in exchange for Tangela Smith.
May 7, 2008: The Mercury traded Leilani Mitchell to the New York Liberty in exchange for a third-round pick in the 2009 Draft.
January 30, 2009: The Mercury traded Kelly Miller and LaToya Pringle to the Minnesota Lynx in exchange for Nicole Ohlde.
March 20, 2009: The Mercury traded Barbara Farris to the Sacramento Monarchs in exchange for A'Quonesia Franklin and Kim Smith.
March 26, 2009: The Mercury traded a first-round pick in the 2010 Draft to the Los Angeles Sparks in exchange for Temeka Johnson.
March 30, 2010: The Mercury traded Cappie Pondexter and Kelly Mazzante to the New York Liberty and received Candice Dupree from the Chicago Sky. Chicago received Shameka Christon and Cathrine Kraayeveld from New York as part of this trade.
July 23, 2010: The Mercury traded Nicole Ohlde and a first-round pick in the 2011 Draft in exchange for Kara Braxton.
April 11, 2011: The Mercury traded Tahnee Robinson to the Connecticut Sun in exchange for a third-round pick in the 2012 Draft.
August 4, 2011: The Mercury traded Kara Braxton to the New York Liberty in exchange for Sidney Spencer.
January 12, 2012: The Mercury traded Temeka Johnson to the Tulsa Shock in exchange for Andrea Riley.
February 2, 2012: The Mercury traded a second-round pick in the 2013 Draft to the Minnesota Lynx in exchange for Alexis Hornbuckle.
February 28, 2012: The Mercury traded the 18th pick in the 2012 Draft to the Minnesota Lynx in exchange for Charde Houston and the 24th pick in the 2012 Draft.
March 11, 2014: The Mercury traded Lynetta Kizer to the Indiana Fever in exchange for Erin Phillips.
March 27, 2014: The Mercury traded Charde Houston to the Seattle Storm in exchange for Ewelina Kobryn.
May 12, 2014: The Mercury traded Maggie Lucas to the Indiana Fever in exchange for a second-round pick in the 2015 Draft.
May 9, 2016: The Mercury traded Monique Currie to the San Antonio Stars in exchange for a second-round pick in the 2017 Draft.
June 25, 2016: The Mercury traded Courtney Williams, Jillian Alleyne, and San Antonio's second-round pick to the Connecticut Sun in exchange for Kelsey Bone.
June 25, 2016: The Mercury traded Noelle Quinn to the Seattle Storm in exchange for Angel Robinson.
January 31, 2017: The Mercury traded Isabelle Harrison and a 2017 first round draft pick to the San Antonio Stars in exchange for Danielle Robinson.
February 21, 2017: In a three-team trade, the Mercury traded Candice Dupree and a second round pick in the 2017 Draft to the Indiana Fever and acquired Camille Little and the draft rights to Jillian Alleyne from the Connecticut Sun.
February 21, 2018: The Mercury traded Cayla George for the 21st pick in the 2018 WNBA Draft.  In a separate trade, the Mercury traded Kelsey Bone for 26th pick in the 2018 WNBA draft and a third round pick in the 2019 WNBA Draft.
March 6, 2018: The Mercury traded the 8th pick in the 2018 WNBA Draft for Briann January.  In a separate trade, the Mercury traded Danielle Robinson and a second round pick in the 2019 WNBA Draft for the 12th pick in the 2018 WNBA Draft.
May 21, 2019: The Mercury traded Stephanie Talbot to Minnesota in exchange for Minnesota's second round pick in the 2020 Draft.
February 11, 2020: The Mercury traded DeWanna Bonner to Connecticut in exchange for the 7th and 10th pick in the 2020 Draft and Connecticut's first round pick in the 2021 Draft.
February 12, 2020: The Mercury traded the 5th and 7th pick in the 2020 Draft and Connecticut's first round pick in the 2021 Draft (acquired via Feb. 11 trade) to Dallas in exchange for Skylar Diggins-Smith.
February 19, 2020: The Mercury traded Briann January, the 17th pick in the 2020 Draft, and their second round pick in the 2021 Draft to Atlanta for Jessica Breland and Nia Coffey.
April 17, 2020: The Mercury traded the draft rights to Jocelyn Willoughby to New York in exchange for Shatori Walker-Kimbrough.
February 10, 2021: The Mercury traded the 6th overall pick in the 2021 Draft and a first round pick in the 2022 Draft to New York in exchange for Kia Nurse and Megan Walker.
February 13, 2021: The Mercury traded Yvonne Turner to Atlanta for the Dream's 2022 third round pick.
January 31, 2022: The Mercury traded Kia Vaugh to Atlanta for the Dream's 2023 third round pick.
February 3, 2022: The Mercury traded Bria Hartley, the 20th pick in the 2022 Draft and a second round pick in the 2023 Draft to Indiana and their 2023 First Round pick to Chicago in exchange for Diamond DeShields.

All-Stars
1997: No All-Star Game
1998: No All-Star Game
1999: Michelle Timms
2000: Brandy Reed
2001: None
2002: None
2003: Adrian Williams
2004: Anna DeForge, Diana Taurasi
2005: Diana Taurasi
2006: Cappie Pondexter, Diana Taurasi
2007: Cappie Pondexter, Diana Taurasi, Penny Taylor
2008: No All-Star Game
2009: Cappie Pondexter, Diana Taurasi
2010: Candice Dupree, Diana Taurasi, Penny Taylor
2011: Diana Taurasi, Penny Taylor
2012: No All-Star Game
2013: Brittney Griner, Diana Taurasi
2014: Candice Dupree, Brittney Griner, Diana Taurasi
2015: DeWanna Bonner, Candice Dupree, Brittney Griner
2016: No All-Star Game
2017: Brittney Griner, Diana Taurasi
2018: DeWanna Bonner, Brittney Griner, Diana Taurasi
2019: DeWanna Bonner, Brittney Griner
2020: No All-Star Game
2021: Skylar Diggins-Smith, Brittney Griner, Diana Taurasi
2022: Skylar Diggins-Smith, Brittney Griner

Olympians
2000: Maria Stepanova (RUS)
2004: Diana Taurasi, Penny Taylor (AUS)
2008: Diana Taurasi, Cappie Pondexter, Penny Taylor (AUS)
2012: Diana Taurasi
2016: Brittney Griner, Diana Taurasi, Penny Taylor (AUS), Sonja Petrović (SER), Lindsey Harding (BLR), Marta Xargay (ESP)
2020: Skylar Diggins-Smith, Brittney Griner, Diana Taurasi, Kia Nurse (CAN), Alanna Smith (AUS)

Honors and awards

1997 All-WNBA Second Team: Jennifer Gillom
1998 All-WNBA First Team: Jennifer Gillom
2002 Kim Perrot Sportsmanship Award: Jennifer Gillom
2004 Rookie of the Year: Diana Taurasi
2004 All-WNBA First Team: Diana Taurasi
2005 All-WNBA Second Team: Diana Taurasi
2006 All-WNBA First Team: Diana Taurasi
2006 All-Rookie Team: Cappie Pondexter
2006 Peak Performer (Scoring): Diana Taurasi
2007 Finals MVP: Cappie Pondexter
2007 All-WNBA First Team: Diana Taurasi
2007 All-WNBA First Team: Penny Taylor
2008 All-WNBA First Team: Diana Taurasi
2008 Peak Performer (Scoring): Diana Taurasi
2009 Most Valuable Player: Diana Taurasi
2009 Finals MVP: Diana Taurasi
2009 All-WNBA First Team: Diana Taurasi
2009 All-WNBA First Team: Cappie Pondexter
2009 All-Rookie Team: DeWanna Bonner
2009 Sixth Woman of the Year: DeWanna Bonner
2009 Peak Performer (Scoring): Diana Taurasi
2010 All-WNBA First Team: Diana Taurasi
2010 Sixth Woman of the Year: DeWanna Bonner
2010 Peak Performer (Scoring): Diana Taurasi
2011 All-WNBA First Team: Diana Taurasi
2011 All-WNBA Second Team: Penny Taylor
2011 Sixth Woman of the Year: DeWanna Bonner
2011 Peak Performer (Scoring): Diana Taurasi
2012 All-Rookie Team: Samantha Prahalis
2013 All-WNBA First Team: Diana Taurasi
2013 All-Rookie Team: Brittney Griner
2014 Finals MVP: Diana Taurasi
2014 Defensive Player of the Year: Brittney Griner
2014 Peak Performer (Assists): Diana Taurasi
2014 Coach of the Year: Sandy Brondello
2014 All-WNBA First Team: Brittney Griner
2014 All-WNBA First Team: Diana Taurasi
2014 All-Defensive First Team: Brittney Griner
2015 Defensive Player of the Year: Brittney Griner
2015 All-Defensive First Team: Brittney Griner
2015 All-Defensive Second Team: DeWanna Bonner
2015 All-WNBA First Team: DeWanna Bonner
2015 All-WNBA Second Team: Brittney Griner
2016 All-Defensive Second Team: Brittney Griner
2017 All-WNBA Second Team: Diana Taurasi
2017 All-WNBA Second Team: Brittney Griner
2018 All-WNBA First Team: Diana Taurasi
2018 All-WNBA Second Team: Brittney Griner
2019 Most Improved Player: Leilani Mitchell
2019 Peak Performer (Points): Brittney Griner
2019 All-WNBA First Team: Brittney Griner
2019 All-Defensive Second Team: Brittney Griner
2019 All-Rookie Team: Brianna Turner
2020 All-Defensive First Team: Brianna Turner
2020 All-WNBA Second Team: Diana Taurasi
2020 All-WNBA Second Team: Skylar Diggins-Smith
2021 All-Defensive First Team: Brianna Turner
2021 All-Defensive Second Team: Brittney Griner
2021 All-WNBA First Team: Skylar Diggins-Smith
2021 All-WNBA First Team: Brittney Griner
2022 All-WNBA First Team: Skylar Diggins-Smith

Notes

References

External links
 Gaines announced as Head Coach of the Mercury
 Phoenix Mercury coverage from The Arizona Republic/azcentral.com

 
Women's National Basketball Association teams
Basketball teams established in 1997
1997 establishments in Arizona
Sports in Phoenix, Arizona
Basketball teams in Arizona
Women's sports in Arizona